Narayana Group of Educational Institutions are chain of Schools, Junior Colleges, Coaching centers and Professional Colleges across India. It is founded by Dr P. Narayana. They claim to be one of Asia’s largest educational conglomerates. There are about 300 schools, 300 junior colleges, 8 professional colleges and many other coaching centers for JEE, NEET, UPSC CSE and other competitive exams. It is founded by former minister of Andhra Pradesh and leader of Telugu Desam Party Dr. Ponguru Narayana. These Institutions emphasize on coaching for competitive exams.

References

External links 

 Narayana Group
 Narayana Schools
 Narayana Coaching center
 Narayana's The Learning App

Schools in India
Colleges in India
Educational organisations based in India
Non-profit organisations based in India
Cram schools in India
Education companies of India
Education companies established in 1979